This is a list of all major types of Mac computers produced by Apple Inc. in order of introduction date. Macintosh Performa models were often physically identical to other models, in which case they are omitted in favor of the identical twin. Also not listed are model numbers that identify software bundles. For example, the Performa 6115CD and 6116CD differed only in software and were identical to the Power Macintosh 6100, so only the 6100 is listed below. The Apple Network Server and Apple Lisa are included, as they filled high-end niches of the Macintosh line despite not directly running Mac OS.

Timeline

Detailed timeline

1983

1984

1985

1986

1987

1988

1989

1990

1991

1992

1993

1994

1995

1996

1997

1998

1999

2000

2001

2002

2003

2004

2005

2006

2007

2008

2009

2010

2011

2012

2013

2014

2015

2016

2017

2018

2019

2020

2021

2022

2023

See also 

 Mac (computer)
 List of Mac models grouped by CPU type
 Timeline of Apple Inc. products
 Timeline of the Apple II family

Notes

References

Citations

Sources 

 Specifications, Apple Computer, Inc.
 Mac Systems: Apple, EveryMac.com
 Glen Sanford, Apple History, apple-history.com
 Dan Knight, Computer Profiles, LowEndMac, Cobweb Publishing, Inc.

External links 
 Ultimate Mac Timeline at EveryMac.com
 Mactimeline a timeline of Apple software and hardware updates

3
Macintosh models
Macintosh models